Maria Mesner (born 1960) is an Austrian contemporary historian who heads the gender studies program at the University of Vienna. She is co-editor of the journal Österreichischen Zeitschrift für Geschichtswissenschaften (Austrian Journal for Historical Studies) and directs the Bruno Kreisky Archives.

Early life and education
Maria Mesner was born in 1960 in Braunau am Inn to Anna and Walter Mesner. Her mother was a tailor and her father was a toolmaker. She attended the Bundesgymnasium in Braunau am Inn, completing her studies in 1978. That year she enrolled in a double major in German history and philology and sociology at the University of Vienna, graduating in 1986 with her magister degree. She completed her PhD under Edith Saurer with the dissertation Die Aus-einandersetzung um den Schwangerschaftsabbruch in Österreich. Zur politischen Kultur der Zweiten Republik (The Dispute over Abortion in Austria: In the Political Culture of the Second Republic) in 1994.

Career
She was promoted to head the Social Sciences and Documentation Department in 1996, working in that capacity until 1999, when she went to New York to attend The New School for Social Research as a Fulbright visiting scholar. Returning to Austria, she was hired to head the Bruno Kreisky Archives in 2000 and the following year began working as co-editor of the journal Österreichischen Zeitschrift für Geschichtswissenschaften (Austrian Journal for Historical Studies). Completing her habilitation in 2004, Mesner began lecturing at the University of Vienna and was promoted to senior lecturer in 2012. Since 2015, she has headed the department of gender research at the University of Vienna and in 2016 became the assistant director of the university's Institute for Contemporary History.

Mesner's research focuses on the effect of gender on politics, reproductive history, and denazification. She has evaluated the abortion laws in Austria to examine how a women's problem became appropriated by male-dominated political systems, in an attempt to preserve archaic social norms as a mechanism to provide political stability. She has also compared the use of laws in Austria to those in the United States and other countries to evaluate differences in reproduction history, as well as the changing effects of political and scientific thought, such as Nazism, eugenics, and assisted reproductive technology on policies governing reproduction.

Selected works

References

Citations

Bibliography

1960 births
Living people
People from Braunau am Inn
University of Vienna alumni
Academic staff of the University of Vienna
Austrian women historians
Gender studies academics
Austrian women academics
20th-century Austrian historians
21st-century Austrian historians